Hamilton Airport  is an airport located 14 kilometres south of the city of Hamilton in the Waikato region, in New Zealand. It is sited at Rukuhia, which was the name of the Royal New Zealand Air Force base on that site during World War II.

Passenger numbers 
In the year to 30 June 2011 the airport had 316,000 domestic and 46,000 international passengers. In 2017/18 there were 353,000 passengers, all domestic, 54% of them to Wellington and 37% to Christchurch. Hamilton is the tenth-busiest airport in New Zealand by passenger traffic.

History
The airport is on land formerly owned by Samuel Steele (brother of William Steele, who brought militia-settlers from Sydney to Hamilton in 1864) from about 1880. By 1929 there was a landing ground on the farm, though a site close to the city was also considered. In 1935 Steele's aerodrome was sold for expansion into an airport and opened by the mayor on 12 October.

As the world prepared for war, it became clear that a landing strip needed to be constructed in the Hamilton area. By 1935, the air strip was already in service, as a stopover for military aircraft that would land after a long journey. Services provided refueling as well as food and rest for the incoming pilots.

Travel by air began to blossom soon after the war was over, and, in 1950, the airport received its first commercial flight. The main runway was sealed in 1965, and turboprop flights began to Hamilton that year, with NAC's Fokker Friendship aircraft operating. The runway was further lengthened to accommodate Vickers Viscount, 1970, and ultimately Boeing 737 aircraft types in 1975.

In 1989, the New Zealand government sold the airport to councils representing Hamilton City (50 per cent), Waikato District (15.625 per cent), Waipa District (15.625 per cent), Matamata-Piako District (15.625 per cent) and Ōtorohanga District (3.125 per cent). This development led to unprecedented growth for the airport.

Ansett New Zealand built an independent passenger terminal to the south of the main building, equipping it with a Golden Wing Club lounge and food vending machines. The airline's Ansett NZ division operated flights to Wellington from Hamilton from 1995 until 2000, when Ansett NZ was sold to a New Zealand business consortium and rebranded Qantas NZ, with their own New Zealand domestic flights division. Qantas NZ operated at the airport until 2001, when it went into receivership. The terminal was then occupied by Origin Pacific airlines. This airline operated domestic services until it too went bankrupt in 2006. The small terminal was then left unused.

In 1998, Hamilton Airport Motor Inn was developed to cater for travellers using the airport.  It was purchased by the airport company in 2019 and is operated as Jet Park Hotel Hamilton Airport.

A NZ$15.3 million terminal expansion begun in 2005 featured a 60 per cent increase in floorspace with improved baggage handling areas, better international and domestic check-in space, and passenger security screening. It was completed in late 2007.

Hugh McCarroll was the airport's chief executive from the early 2000s until retirement in February 2006. The current chief executive is Mark Morgan.

Trans Tasman services
In 1994, the airport became a terminal for Trans Tasman air routes, with charter flights provided on Boeing 727s by Kiwi Travel International Airlines (not to be confused with the United States-based Kiwi International Air Lines) which served Brisbane, Sydney and Melbourne. New Zealand's Kiwi went bankrupt in 1996, but by that time Freedom Air had begun flying the same routes with Boeing 737 aircraft. They also, briefly, operated flights to Nadi, Fiji, in 2005. Freedom Air ultimately decided to make Hamilton International Airport their company hub until parent company Air New Zealand closed the airline down on 30 March 2008 operating its own full service instead. By then, the Airbus A320 was being operated. When passenger numbers dropped to an unsustainable level in August 2009, Air New Zealand ceased services from Hamilton to Australia. Virgin Australia attempted to fill the need for a trans Tasman service later that year with twice-weekly Boeing 737-800 flights to Brisbane; however, passenger numbers remained low and Virgin Australia ended flights on 27 October 2012. No further international flights have been made from the airport since that date.

Flight training
Hamilton Airport was home to the New Zealand Training Centre of L3Harris Airline Academy. L3Harris Airline Academy is the British flight training division of L3Harris that provides freshly trained airline pilots to numerous airlines throughout the world, mainly within the United Kingdom, most notably EasyJet, and also including British Airways, Qatar, Flybe, Thomson, Oman and, formerly, Thomas Cook and Monarch Airlines among others.
Most of the non-passenger traffic at this airport was generated by L3Harris training flights, in single-engined Diamond DA20 and Cessna 172, and twin-engined Diamond DA42 Twin Star aircraft. The school closed in February 2021, with all training moving to the UK and Portugal. The company cited the COVID-19 pandemic as a cause, but not the sole reason

The Waikato Aero Club has been based at Hamilton Airport since 1933. The club provides a full range of flight training from recreational flying in Light Sport Aircraft through to commercial Multi-Engine IFR.

Capabilities
The airport currently accommodates many different types of aircraft, from piston-engined light aircraft to commercial turboprop aircraft such as the ATR 72. The airport can handle all light business jets as well as 40-to-80-seat regional jets such as the Embraer E195 and Bombardier CRJ200. Several airliners can operate from the airport including the 100-200 seat Boeing 737, Boeing 757 and Airbus A320. The largest aircraft authorised to land at Hamilton is the 150-to-250-seat Boeing 767. Plans to increase runway length from 2,195m to 3,000m to attract larger aircraft and start Asian regional flights, have been considered.

The airport operates 24 hours a day, seven days a week.

In August 2011, approval was received by Hamilton International Airport to extend its runway up to 3,000 metres—the same size as secondary airports in other parts of the world, such as the Gold Coast. It will finish before 15 years' approval ends.

The airport has a single terminal building and 6 tarmac gates. The apron is capable of accommodating up to five A320/737-800 aircraft at once.

Airlines and destinations

See also

 List of airports in New Zealand
 List of airlines of New Zealand
 Transport in New Zealand
 List of busiest airports in New Zealand

References

External links

Hamilton Airport website

Airports in New Zealand
Buildings and structures in Hamilton, New Zealand
Geography of Hamilton, New Zealand
Waipa District
Transport buildings and structures in Waikato